Ada Negri (3 February 187011 January 1945) was an Italian poet and writer. She was the only woman to be admitted to the Academy of Italy.

Biography
Ada Negri was born in Lodi, Italy, into a humble family: her father was Giuseppe Negri, a coachman, and her mother was Vittoria Cornalba, a weaver. 

Her childhood was characterized by her relationship with her grandmother, Giuseppina "Peppina" Panni, who worked as a caretaker at the noble Barni family's palace, in which Ada spent much time alone, observing the passage of people, as described in the autobiographical novel Stella Mattutina (1921).

She attended Lodi’s normal school for girls and earned an elementary teacher’s diploma. At eighteen, she became a schoolteacher in the village of Motta Visconti near the Ticino river, in Pavia. She was encouraged by the teacher Paolo Tedeschi, who had noticed in the little girl a great imagination and high learning skills.  In Pavia, Ada Negri lived in Palazzo Cornazzani, in the same building that Ugo Foscolo, Contardo Ferrini, and Albert Einstein also lived in at different times. Her first volume of lyrics, Fatalità (1892) confirmed her reputation as a poet and she was appointed to the normal school in Milan. Her second book of poems, Tempeste (1896), describes the helpless tragedy of the forsaken poor.

On 28 March 1896, she married industrialist Giovanni Garlanda of Biella, who had fallen in love with her from reading her poetry. By 1904, they had two daughters, Bianca and Vittoria. The latter died in infancy. In 1913, Negri separated from her husband and moved to Switzerland with Bianca. Afterwards, she constantly migrated. She was a frequent visitor to Laglio on Lake Como, where she wrote her only novel, an autobiographical work, Stella Mattutina (Morning Star), published in 1921. The book was published in English in 1930. In March 1923, Negro began an extended stay on the island Capri, where she wrote I canti dell'isola.

In 1940 she was admitted as the first female member of the Italian Academy. However, this achievement stained her reputation later in life as members of the Academy had to swear loyalty to the Fascist regime. They were rewarded by the government with various material benefits. 

Negri was one of the contributors of a nationalist women's magazine, Lidel, which was published between 1919 and 1935. Her work was widely translated during her lifetime, with individual poems published in newspapers in the U.S. and elsewhere.

On 11 January 1945, her daughter Bianca found Negri dead in her studio in Milan. She was 74 years old.

The actress Pola Negri (born Barbara Apolonia Chałupec), adopted the stage surname "Negri" in emulation of the poet. The actress Paola Pezzaglia was the ideal interpreter of her poetry on stage.

Criticism
Benedetto Croce described her work as "facile, tearful, completely centered on the melodiousness and readiness of emotions — poetics that are somewhat melancholy, idyllic-elegiac." He dismissed her, writing that a "lack or imperfection in artistic work is most particularly a feminine flaw (difetto femminile). It is precisely woman’s maternal instinct, her 'stupendous and all-consuming' ability to mother a child, that prevents her from successfully giving birth to a fully realized literary work."

However, other critics saw her as "someone whose vision focused on the toils of life in a way few other writers did during those troubled times. Her naturally lyrical soul knew, in the major parts of her works, how to transform with an imprint of originality the sufferings, the bitterness, the joys of an entire generation." She was described as a writer who "abolished established conventions, and shaped her lyrics according to the rhythms of the heart, in sync to whatever it is that makes the winds blow, gives rise to the waters and pulse to the stars — a poetry infinitely free, capricious and precise."

Her work and her life continued to be haunted by the injustice of life, and she even refused to allow her final volume of poetry to be published until World War II ended. Like many Italian writers of this period, her reputation after 1945 suffered from being associated with the Fascist movement, having received the Mussolini Prize in 1931. The prize was funded by Corriere della Sera.

Works

Poetry
 Fatalità (1892)
 Tempeste (1896)
 Maternità (1904)
 Dal profondo (1910)
 Esilio (1914)
 Il libro di Mara (1919), 
 The Book of Mara, translated into English by Maria A. Costantini, Italica Press (2011)
 I canti dell’isola (1925)
 Songs of the Island, translated by Maria A. Costantini. Italica Press (2011)
 Vespertina (1930)
 Il dono (1936)
 Fons amoris (1946), published posthumously

Prose
 Le solitarie (1917)
 Orazioni (1918)
 Stella mattutina (1921)
 Morning Star, translated by Anne Day. Macmillan Co., (1930). Republished, Sublunary Editions  (2021)
 Finestre alte (1923)
 Le strade (1926)
 Sorelle (1929)
 Di giorno in giorno (1932)
 Erba sul sagrato (1939)
 Oltre (1947) published posthumously

References

Further reading
 
 Bibliography

External links
 
 
 
 

1870 births
1945 deaths
People from Lodi, Lombardy
Italian women poets
Members of the Royal Academy of Italy
20th-century Italian poets
20th-century Italian women writers